Thrippunithura or Tripunithura, is a prominent historical and residential region in the City of Kochi in Kerala, India. Located about 7 km (4 mi) from the city centre, Tripunithura was the capital of the erstwhile Kingdom of Cochin. The descendants of the Cochin royal family still live in the palaces here. The Hill Palace situated in Tripunithura was the palace of Maharaja of Cochin, the ruler of Kingdom of Cochin. Tripunithura is also well known for its historical cultures which includes the annual festival Vrishchikoltsawam that takes place at the Sree Poornathrayeesa Temple.

In local administration, it is a municipality named Tripunithura Municipality. In the state administrative structure, Tripunithura is part of the Ernakulam District in the state of Kerala.

Etymology
Some latter day Sanskrit enthusiasts describe the origin of the name to "pūrṇa vēda puri" — the town of Vedas in its entirety. Another possible origin to name comes from the meaning "the land on the shores of Poorna river" above doesn't give sense. Thirupunithra = Thiru punitha thara (or Thiru Punitha Thura) means the land that which is holy(thara literally means a platform or an elevated stage). Pooni might also refer to the bag used to carry arrows.

History

Thrippunithura is known as the Raja Nagari (royal city) and is one of the most prominent centers of traditional Kerala cultural heritage. The palaces of the Cochin Royal House are renowned for being patrons of traditional arts, architecture,literature and music. The erstwhile rulers of Kingdom of Cochin were great patrons of art. This made fine arts and architecture flourish under them in many ways. The town is also a prominent centre of learning for classical arts like Carnatic music, Kathakali and Mohiniyattam besides percussion instruments like mridangam, chenda and maddalam. Much of this is facilitated by the RLV College of Music and Institute of Fine Arts was established here in 1956. Another center of learning is Kerala Kalalayam which was established by Kathakali artist Padmashree Kalamandalam Krishnan Nair and Mohiniyattam artist Kalamandalam Kalyanikutty Amma in 1952. Tripunithura has many dedicated centers for stage performances and promotion of art established by the royal family

Buildings

Temples
 Sree Poornathrayesa Temple

 Thamaramkulangara Sree Dharma Sastha Temple

 Muthukulangara Temple Eroor
  Pisharikovil Temple Eroor
 Poonithura Kottaram Sree Krishna Temple
 Poonithura Sree Subrahmanya Swami Temple
 Chakkamkulangara Shiva Temple
 Perunninakulam Shiva Temple
 Kumaramankalam Temple
 Pallippattu Kavu Bhagavathy Temple
 Renuka Devi Amman Temple
 Bala Ganapathi Temple
 Kodamkulangara Sree Dharma Shasthra Temple.                       * Maramkulangara temple Eroor
 Pottayampalam temple Eroor
 Ayrettial Temple Eroor
The famous Bhagavathi temple in Chottanikkara village is located just 5 km away from Thrippunithura towards the south-east.

Restaurants and hotels
There are many restaurants and hotels in and around Tripunithura. There are several eateries which offers excellent vegetarian choices and sweets. The Statue Junction of the town is filled with many refreshment centres including restaurants and juice bars. The main lodgings available are in Vadakkekota - Prasanth Hotel and also many others. The Abhishekam Convention Hall is one of the meeting halls available in Tripunithura.

Demographics
Tripunithura has a population of 92,522. Males constitute 49% of the population and females 51%. Thrippunithura has an average literacy rate of  94.34%, higher than the national average of 71.5%: male literacy is 97.37%, and female literacy is 91.52%. In Tripunithura, 10% of the population is under 6 years of age. Religion Hinduism 82.78%, Christianity 15.28%, Islam 1.35%.

Local government
Thrippunithura is administered by an elected municipal council headed by the chairperson. LDF is currently ruling the municipality with Rema Santhosh as its chairperson.

Villages in Tripunithura municipality
 Tripunithura-Nadama
 Thekkumbhagam
 Thiruvankulam

Education

Tripunithura has many educational institutions which makes the place a good haven for education. Primary, High and Higher Secondary School education is available in many schools. The Government schools functioning in Tripunithura include the Government Sanskrit High School, Government Girls High School, Government Palace High School and Government Boys High School as well as private management schools like The Convent School and The Shree Venkiteshwara School.

There are also a few privately managed CBSE schools, namely, Bhavans Vidya Mandir, Chinmaya Vidyalaya, Sree Narayana Vidya Peetam Public School, the Nair Service Society (NSS) Higher Secondary School, The Choice School which function in various parts of the town to provide the necessary basics and also higher education for children. The landmark of the town is the RLV Music College which provides proteges with training in Classical music and has also produced many great singers most notably K. J. Yesudas.

Tripunithura also has 4 government colleges such as Government College Tripunithura (Arts College), Sanskrit College Tripunithura, RLV College of Fine Arts, and Government Ayurveda College.

Geography 
Thripunithura is surrounded by stretches of Vembanad Lake and Canals which sustain inland navigation. The town is situated almost 8 meters above Mean Sea Level. The town is extends up to the East Till Thiruvankulam.

Transport
Tripunithura has a main bus-stand in its main centre with buses going from and coming into from different locations. Furthermore, it has bus-stops in almost every part of the town which makes travel by bus easier. Railway transport is also available. NH 85(Kochi Madurai highway) or Old NH 49 passes through Karingachira. Ernakulam-Ettumanoor State Highway(SH 15) also passes through Thrippunithura.

Tripunithura railway station is a major railway station in Ernakulam to Kottayam route with many passenger trains and express trains having a stop here.

A new metro station is coming up at thripunithura, to be operational by june 2023

Royal Heritage

Location

References

External links

Neighbourhoods in Kochi
Regions of Kochi
Kathakali
Former capital cities in India